Mahapurush is a 2022 Nepali drama film written and directed by Pradip Bhattarai. The film stars Maha Jodi (Madan Krishna Shrestha and Hari Bansha Acharya), along with Gauri Malla, Rabindra Singh Baniya, Rajaram Paudel, Arun Chhetri, and Anjana Baraili. The film is about a widowed father of two sons finds love at an old age and struggles as a society and his own sons disapprove of it. It was released on 28 October 2022, simultaneously in Nepal, United States, Australia, United Kingdom, Japan, South Korea, and the Middle East countries. The film met with positive response from audience with praise directed towards performance of the cast, social message, background score and direction with some critics criticizing it climax. The film was a blockbuster at the box office crossing NPR 10.5 crore gross in Nepal alone and went on to become one of the highest grossing Nepali film of the year.

Synopsis 
The story is about a single father who lost his wife years ago; he now lives with his two sons. He falls in love in a later stage of his life. As a result, he must deal with family and social issues, since the idea of getting married at such an age is not a common phenomenon in society and is considered taboo.

Cast 

 Hari Bansha Acharya
 Madan Krishna Shrestha
 Gauri Malla
 Rabindra Singh Baniya
 Rajaram Poudyal
 Arun Chhetri
 Anjana Baraili
 Prem Pandey 
 Siru Bista
 Kopila Thapa
 Shikha Tamang
 Kabita Shrestha
 Naresh Paudel
 Narendra Kangsakar
 Sabin Bastola
 Arjun Acharya
 Suman Rimal

Soundtrack

Reception 
The film received mixed but mostly negative reviews from critics, while it received mostly positive reviews from the audience.

Shiva Mukhiya from Online Khabar rated the film 2.5 out of 5, and mentioned: "Mahapurush tells the story of each audience. The actors have justified their characters and their dialogue delivery and acting is natural. Yet, the film has a few glitches in terms of cinematography. Sound and lighting arrangements look awkward sometimes. The film takes a long time to develop the story than it actually deserves, and the makers need to understand that modern audiences value compactness."

References

External links 

 

Nepalese drama films
2022 films
2020s Nepali-language films
2022 drama films